Aspe is a town and municipality in Alicante, Spain.

Aspe may also refer to:

 Aspe (surname)
 ASPE (Basque pelota), a sports management company
 Aspe peak, a mountain in the Pyrenees
 Gave d'Aspe, a torrential river in the Pyrenees
 Aspe Valley, named after the river

Abbreviations
 American Society for Precision Engineering
 American Society of Plumbing Engineers
 Accounting Standard for Private Enterprises, a component of the Generally Accepted Accounting Principles of Canada
 American Society of Professional Estimators, an association of professional building estimators
 Assistant Secretary for Planning and Evaluation, an agency of the United States Department of Health and Human Services
 Associazione Italiana per gli Studi di Politica Estera (Italian Association for Foreign Policy Studies), an organization that publishes the journal Affari Esteri

See also 
 Asp (disambiguation)